Siegas is a community in the Canadian province of New Brunswick.

The special service area and taxing authority within the local service district of the parish of Sainte-Anne-de-Madawaska.

History

Notable people

See also
List of communities in New Brunswick

References

Communities in Madawaska County, New Brunswick